Mapatizya is a constituency of the National Assembly of Zambia. It covers Zimba District in Southern Province, including the town of Zimba.

List of MPs

References 

Constituencies of the National Assembly of Zambia
1991 establishments in Zambia
Constituencies established in 1991